Discovery Channel Germany is the German version of the Discovery Channel. It is operated by Warner Bros. Discovery Deutschland, which is located in Munich.

It was launched on 27 August 1996 on the DF1 satellite platform. Back then, the channel was a joint-venture between Kirch Media and Discovery Communications. After DF1 merged with Premiere World in 1999, it remained on the new Premiere platform.

Kirch Media went bankrupt in 2002 and Discovery Communications subsequently became the sole owner of the channel.

The channel was later joined by sister channel with the launch on Animal Planet in 2004, Discovery Geschichte in 2005 and Discovery HD in 2006.

Discovery Channel was exclusively available through Premiere until 2009, when a new agreement was entered between Premiere and Discovery. The new contract allows the Discovery Channel to broadcast from other providers from 1 July and means that Animal Planet and Discovery Geschichte would disappear from Premiere.

Audience share

Germany

References

External links
 Official website

Television stations in Germany
Television stations in Austria
Television stations in Switzerland
German-language television stations
Television channels and stations established in 1996
Mass media in Munich
Germany
Warner Bros. Discovery EMEA